Halifax Atlantic is a provincial electoral district in Nova Scotia, Canada, that elects one member of the Nova Scotia House of Assembly.

The Member of the Legislative Assembly since 2013 has been Brendan Maguire of the Nova Scotia Liberal Party.

It is located in the Halifax Regional Municipality, just south of the Halifax peninsula. It includes Spryfield, Herring Cove, Sambro, and Harrietsfield.

Geography

Statistics 
Population: 21,360  (2003)
Avg. Income: $27,570 (2003)

Members of the Legislative Assembly
This riding has elected the following Members of the Legislative Assembly:

Election results

1967 general election

1970 general election

1974 general election

1978 general election

1981 general election

1984 general election

1988 general election

1993 general election

1998 general election

1999 general election

2003 general election

2006 general election

2009 general election

2013 general election

 
|Liberal
|Brendan Maguire
|align="right"|3,244
|align="right"|42.54 
|align="right"|
|-
 
|New Democratic Party
|Tanis Crosby 
|align="right"|2,564 
|align="right"| 33.63
|align="right"|
|-
 
|Progressive Conservative
|Ryan Brennan
|align="right"|1,817
|align="right"|23.83
|align="right"|
|}

2017 general election

2021 general election

References

External links 
 riding map
 CBC nova scotia riding profile
 June 13, 2006 Nova Scotia Provincial General Election Poll By Poll Results

Nova Scotia provincial electoral districts
Politics of Halifax, Nova Scotia